Veronica recurva, synonym Hebe recurva, is a flowering plant of the family Plantaginaceae, which is endemic to the north-west area of Nelson on the South Island of New Zealand. It is an evergreen shrub, reaching  in height, with gray, spear-shaped leaves that are 2–4 cm long. Flowers are white.

Veronica recurva may be a synonym of Veronica albicans. , Plants of the World Online treated Hebe recurva as an unplaced name, and did not list Veronica recurva.

Mature leaves curve backwards slightly, hence the specific epithet recurva. 

The cultivar 'Boughton Silver' has received the Royal Horticultural Society's Award of Garden Merit.

References

recurva
Flora of New Zealand